Bob Woodruff (b. 1961) is an American television journalist.

Bob Woodruff is also the name of:

Bob Woodruff (American football) (1916–2001), American college football player and coach
Bob Woodruff (singer) (born 1961), American country music singer and songwriter

See also
Robert Woodruff (disambiguation)